{{DISPLAYTITLE:C8H11N3O3S}}
The molecular formula C8H11N3O3S (molar mass: 229.26 g/mol, exact mass: 229.0521 u) may refer to:

 Apricitabine
 Lamivudine (3TC)

Molecular formulas